The Liaden universe (  or ) is the setting for an ongoing series of science fiction stories written by Sharon Lee and Steve Miller. The series covers a considerable time period, some thousands of years in all, although since it also covers more than one universe the exact chronology is unclear. However the main timeline extends across only a few generations.

The central stories primarily concern Clan Korval, a leading house in Liaden society. The stories are primarily in the genre of space opera, with heavy doses of romance, intrigue, and wizardry.

As of May 2022 the series comprises 24 novels and 33 chapbooks (the stories within them now available as ebooks or in collections).

Overview
The series is set at some unspecified time in the future. There is a reference to the planet named "Terra" not being the first planet to bear that name; however, the familiar names and cultural references in the core books (coupled with a lack of them in the "Crystal" books) suggest that it is "our" earth nonetheless. In the wake of a diaspora from a "decrystallizing" galaxy that was mankind's prior home, the human race is divided into three major sub-races: Terran, Liaden and Yxtrang. (There are also numerous isolated colony planets that have backslid technologically and are held as protectorates until their civilizations regain enough advances to cope with extraplanetary contact.)

The original seven-book "Agent of Change" sequence tells of the struggle between Clan Korval, a Liaden Clan of much note, and the mysterious "Department of the Interior". Though their headquarters on Liad were destroyed at the end of the original sequence, vestiges of the Department continue to plague Clan Korval in subsequent novels.

The eighth novel, Balance of Trade, is set 275 years prior to the end of the "Agent of Change" sequence. It features Jethri Gobelyn, a young Terran trader who is adopted by a Liaden Master Trader to the consternation of virtually everyone. A sequel to this popular book, Trade Secret, was published in 2013 and follows Jethri as he starts his career as a trader. (A third book in the sequence, Fair Trade, was published in May 2022.)

The ninth novel, Crystal Soldier, published in February 2005, takes place even earlier still: it is the first half of "The Great Migration Duology", and tells the story of Cantra yos'Phelium, who piloted the original exodus to Liad, and her partner M Jela. The sequel, Crystal Dragon, was published in 2006 and takes the story up through the founding of Liad and of Clan Korval.

There is a timeline of the Liaden novels, below.

History of the series
The series almost failed to take flight, and probably would only be three books long except for the Internet. The authors had written the first three books (Agent of Change, Conflict of Honors, Carpe Diem, published in 1988-89) but were told that sales were not sufficient to justify continuing.

Unbeknownst to them the books had caused such a stir on the Usenet group rec.arts.sf.written that they were added to the group's FAQ. Upon gaining Internet access, the authors were surprised to find so many people looking for the next book, and even more surprised that its title was already decided upon: Plan B. They published some chapbooks to stave off the hungry fans and started writing: Plan B (published in 1999) and a further three books followed in due course to complete the "Agent of Change" sequence. There are also a number of short stories, some filling in gaps between novels, some providing background on minor (and not so minor) characters.

The series is ongoing , with twenty-three novels and numerous chapbooks and short stories, and a number of new novels contracted to be written. See "Forthcoming", below.

All the novels are available as ebooks.

Books in the series
The first three novels were originally published in mass-market by Del Rey. The novels were later re-published, along with several subsequent novels, by the now-defunct Meisha Merlin, who have also anthologised the earlier novels. The novels were then re-issued in mass-market by Ace Books.

Earlier books and some of the stories were formerly available in electronic form from Embiid Publishing, which is now out of business.

In 2007, Baen Books published the first 10 Liaden novels in electronic form, followed by two short story collections. Baen began publishing new Liaden novels in 2009, and in 2010 began releasing the first 10 Liaden novels in omnibus trade paperbacks.

Novels

Timeline chart

Chart Notes:
 Time flows down the chart, so events in those novels on the same horizontal level are happening (roughly) concurrently
 Columns represent main characters and/or clans
 Color Key
 Red = Progenitor Universe
 Orange = Trade Areas of Terran and Liaden space
 Yellow = primarily Liaden Space (with primary characters shown in parenthesis)
 Green = Theo's home world (Delgado), first journey, Anlingdin Piloting Academy, and beyond
 Pink = Planet Surebleak
 Blue = Planet Surebleak and wide-ranging space faring & trading
 Gray = Trading, space faring, and A.I. mentoring

Novels listed in the order of the timeline of the Liaden universe.

The Great Migration Duology

These two novels comprise the origin story of the Liaden universe and introduce us to Cantra and Jela.
 Crystal Soldier (February 2005)
 Crystal Dragon (February 2006)

Liaden novels featuring Jethri Gobelyn
These stories of merchants and intrigue take place between "The Great Migration" and "Agent of Change" sequences.

 Balance of Trade (2004, winner of the Hal Clement Award for best Young Adult Science Fiction novel of 2004)
 Trade Secret, a sequel to Balance of Trade, was published by Baen in hardcover in November 2013.
 Fair Trade, a sequel to Trade Secret, was published by Baen in hardcover in May 2022. Ends with a cliffhanger. So ...         . 
 Additional books in the series are following, with the next being Trade Lanes (see "Forthcoming").

The "Agent of Change" sequence
This is the mainline for stories in the Liaden universe. In the later novels the "Theo Waitley" story timeline becomes coincident with the "Clan Korval" and "Surebleak" timelines. See notes below tables.

Notes on novels
 Fledgling (2007), a 31-chapter serialized novel, was first seen in draft form on the authors' website, with chapters released weekly from January 2007 through October 2007. Fledgling introduces Theo Waitley and gives some of the background to her unexpected arrival at the end of I Dare. The revised version Fledgling (2009) was published in hardcover by Baen Books (September 2009 ). The original pre-revision Fledgling can be downloaded for free from both Amazon  and the Baen Free Library.
 Saltation (draft complete, January 2009), the sequel to Fledgling, a weekly serial novel on the authors' website. Publication began on Monday, 21 January 2008. A revised version was released in hardcover by Baen Books in April 2010 .
 Ghost Ship, the sequel to Saltation, was published by Baen Books on 2 August 2011. A synopsis of Ghost Ship was published in September 2010. Ghost Ships first draft was completed in late August 2010, and was published in hardcover  by Baen in August 2011, and paperback  in July 2012
 Dragon Ship, the sequel to Ghost Ship, was published in hardcover by Baen Books on 4 September 2012. .
 Necessity's Child, which occurs on Surebleak at the same time as Ghost Ship, was published by Baen in hardcover in Feb. 2013.
 Dragon in Exile, was published in hardcover (2 June 2015) and e-book (15 May 2015) by Baen Books in May 2015. .

Thirtieth Anniversary Editions
The (30th) Anniversary edition of the first Liaden Universe novel, Agent of Change, was published in November 2018 as a mass market paperback.

The (30th) Anniversary edition of the second Liaden Universe novel, Conflict of Honors, was published in October 2019 as a mass market paperback.

The (30th) Anniversary edition of the third Liaden Universe novel, Carpe Diem, was published in November 2020 as a mass market paperback.

Forthcoming

The latest book to be published was the Jethri Gobelyn novel Fair Trade, a direct sequel to Trade Secret. It was published in May 2022. 

Following Fair Trade will be a fourth Jethri Gobelyn novel (Trade Lanes), and at least two other novels (Salvage Right at least partially set at Tinsori Light) in the Liaden Universe.

Omnibus volumes
Pre-Baen
 Partners in Necessity (Feb. 2000,  hardcover,  trade paperback)
 Contains Conflict of Honors, Agent of Change, and Carpe Diem
 Pilots Choice (Feb. 2001,  hardcover; November 2004,  trade paperback)
 Contains Local Custom and Scout's Progress

Baen e-book only
These were released immediately upon Lee & Miller coming to Baen in the wake of Meisha Merlin's dissolution, to bring the e-books back into print and begin earning royalties for Lee & Miller (who had not been paid by Meisha Merlin) right away. For new readers, the subsequent Baen omnibus editions (below) provide the same books at a lower cost.

 Korval's Legacy Collection (Baen ebook bundle)
 Contains Conflict of Honors, Agent of Change, Carpe Diem, Plan B, and Local Custom
 Phase Change Collection (Baen ebook bundle)
 Contains Scout's Progress, I Dare, Crystal Soldier, Crystal Dragon, and Balance of TradeAdditionally, Agent of Change and Fledgling are available at no cost in the Baen Free Library

Baen print and e-book
 The Dragon Variation (Jun. 2010,  trade paperback)
 Contains Local Custom, Scout's Progress, and Conflict of Honors
 The Agent Gambit (Jan. 2011,  trade paperback)
 Contains Agent of Change and Carpe Diem
 Korval's Game (May 2011,  trade paperback)
 Contains Plan B and I Dare
 The Crystal Variation (Sep. 2011,  trade paperback)
 Contains Crystal Soldier, Crystal Dragon, and Balance of TradeAudio-booksA number of novels have currently available audio-book editions

 Accepting the Lance
 The Tomorrow Log
 Neogenesis
 The Gathering Edge
 Alliance of Equals
 Dragon Ship
 Necessity's Child
 Ghost Ship
 Saltation
 Fledgling
 Mouse & Dragon
 Scout's Progress
 Local Custom
 Balance of Trade
 Crystal Soldier
 Dragon in Exile
 I Dare
 Plan B
 Carpe Diem
 Conflict of Honors
 Crystal Dragon
 Agent of Change

Short stories
These also include stories about Lute and Moonhawk, the earlier incarnations of two major characters in the books. Some short stories also are being made available for free either in the Baen Free Library or at Splinter Universe.

 Current collections 
On 2 April 2012, Sharon Lee and Steve Miller announced that Baen had purchased publication rights for the contents of Chapbooks #1 through #17 (Two Tales of Korval through Skyblaze), and they would be reissued in two volumes. The first, Liaden Universe Constellation Volume I was published by Baen for July 2013 in trade paperback (tpb) and ebook formats. The second volume was published by Baen in January 2014. The third volume was published by Baen in August 2015. The fourth volume was published by Baen in June 2019.

Baen has collected the chapbooks and other short stories in four volumes:

 A Liaden Universe Constellation Volume 1 (2013,  trade paperback,  eBook)
 A Liaden Universe Constellation Volume 2 (2014,  trade paperback,  eBook)
 A Liaden Universe Constellation Volume 3 (2015,  trade paperback,  eBook)
 A Liaden Universe Constellation Volume 4 (4 June 2019,  trade paperback,  eBook)
 A Liaden Universe Constellation Volume 5 (1 February 2022,  trade paperback,  eBook)

 Out of print collections 
The chapbooks have been collected in two compilations:

 Liaden Universe Companion Volume One (2005,  hardcover,  trade paperback)
 Liaden Universe Companion Volume Two (2007,  hardcover,  soft cover)

These stories are also being published by Baen webscriptions as the Liaden Universe Big Bang consisting of Liaden Unibus I and Liaden Unibus II. This includes the first 12 Liaden Universe chapbooks. It does not include the chapbook Calamity's Child (containing Liaden story Sweet Waters and non-Liaden A Night At the Opera), or the non-Liaden chapbooks The Naming of Kinzel and Master Walk.

Selected chapbooks are now being published by SRM Publisher (using the imprint Pinbeam Books) in the Amazon Kindle, Angus & Robertson, Apple, Baen, Barnes and Noble Nook, Google Play, Indigo, Rakuten Kobo, Scribd, Mondadori and Thalia ebook stores. In all these stores, they are sold without DRM. See below for availability.

 Table of Liaden Universe short stories and novelettes 

Characters
As mentioned above, there are three main divisions of the human race which appear in the stories. There are some notable non-humans also.

Liaden
Home planet "Liad". Liadens are usually shorter than the Terran norm, often with golden skin. They are deeply concerned with their melant'i which roughly corresponds to the concern with "face" for which Japanese samurai are famous. Some are almost rabidly isolationist; it is not uncommon for bigoted Liaden to refer to those of other races as "it", likening them to animals. Several characters are part- or even half-Terran: this does not endear them to the isolationists.

Liaden society is clan-based, each Clan being made up of one or more families ("lines"). The Head of a Clan is the "Delm", the head of a line is the "Thodelm"; either might be male or female as circumstances dictate.

Liaden Clans do not generally allow lifemating. Instead, Liadens practice contract marriages, where two individuals from different clans are ordered, or allowed, by their Delms to create a progeny for one of the two clans. This marriage is over when the terms of the contract are fulfilled. Most members of the clan must produce at least one progeny to replace them.

Lifemating is when two individuals become exclusively bound to one and other. This can happen rarely by order of a Delm, or this can happen by the physical, emotional, and spiritual bonding of two individuals with dramliza abilities (regardless of the depth of those abilities).

Some Liaden are trained as explorers: the Scouts. They are regarded with distaste by the more isolationist within Liaden society.

Most of the stories thus far center on members of Clan Korval, made up of the yos'Phelium and yos'Galan lines. Scouts also appear often.Korval Val Con yos'Phelium - Delm, ex-Scout, Lifemate to Miri
 Shan yos'Galan - Master Trader, foster-brother to Val Con; Lifemate of Priscilla Delacroix y Mendoza; (current incarnation of Lute)
 Daav yos'Phelium - ex-Delm, ex-Scout, father to Val Con and Theo Waitley
 Jen Sar Kiladi—Daav's alter ego, a professor of Cultural Genetics at Delgado University. Jen Sar was the onagrata of Kamele Waitley.
 Aelliana Caylon - Lifemate to Daav, mother to Val Con
 Er Thom yos'Galan - Master Trader, Lifemate of Anne Davis, father to Shan, Nova and Anthora
 Pat Rin yos'Phelium - cousin to Val Con
 Kareen yos'Phelium - sister to Daav, mother to Pat Rin, expert on "The Code of proper conduct"
 Anthora yos'Galan - sister to Shan and Nova, with preternatural (Dramliza) abilities
 Ren Zel dea'Judan - Lifemate to Anthora, with preternatural (Dramliza) abilities
 Nova yos'Galan - sister to Shan, Anthora and Val Con
 Luken bel'Tarda - cousin, rug dealer, foster father of Pat Rin.
 Children and younger members (in no particular order) - Quinn, Padi, Syl Vor; Mik and Shindi; and Talizea.
 Jen Sin yos'Phelium - Chief Light Keeper at Tinsori Light. Thought to have died two hundred years ago, but was "merely temporarily misplaced".Others Jan Rek ter'Astin - Scout Captain, friend of Jethri Gobelyn
 Clonak ter'Meulen - Scout, friend of Daav and Val Con
 Shadia ne'Zame - Scout, friend of Clonak
 Win Ton yo'Vala - Scout, friend of Theo Waitley and Less Pilot of Bechimo
 Kara ven'Arith - Crew of Bechimo
 Vertu dea'San - Taxi driver originally from Liad, subsequently exiled to Surebleak. Significant Other to Cheever McFarland.

Terran
Home planet known as "Terra". As remarked above, there is a brief reference to the possibility that this planet is possibly the fourth of that name. Possibly one prior Terra would have been destroyed along with the war-torn universe/Galaxy from which mankind fled in Crystal Dragon, though neither the word Terra, nor Terran appear in that book. From cultural references, familiar English names, and references to regional linguistic dialects that appear in the core books, it seems likely that this Terra is nonetheless our own Earth. There appears to be some resentment that the "younger" races (usually Liaden) hold more power in the realm of shipping and commerce than Terra; there is reference to at least one political party involved in less-than-legal operations. Based on the description of the Liaden as younger races, it may be reasonable to assume that they predated the Liaden arrival in the expanding universe.  Whether they simply arrived sooner and separately from Cantra's convoy or whether Terra existed in the expanded universe separately from the "Predecessor" universe is unclear.

The Juntavas are an organized-crime "clan" who appear in various guises, sometimes as antagonists, sometimes as allies of the main characters. Unlike the real-world mafia, the Juntavas are apparently able to act as an unopposed organized government in their own right, to the point of having appointed officials called Sector Judges who administer justice within their appointed jurisdictions. The Juntavas are usually not as oppressive as they might be, because they have learned that too much of that sort of thing is "bad for business."

A number of other planets are known to have non-Liaden human inhabitants, presumably of the Terran strain. Some of these worlds, such as Surebleak and Delgado, were settled by Terrans from this universe's Terra. Others, such as Sintia, were settled by ships from the same Crystal Dragon-era colonization waves as Liad and Terra.

Some of these colony worlds, such as Vandar, have backslid to pre-spaceflight technology levels. These worlds have been considered interdicted by the Liaden Scout Corps, with external contact forbidden in order to permit their societies to develop without interference. As of "Prodigal Son", post–I Dare, there are signs that this policy may be changing.GobelynsJethri Gobelyn - apprentice trader, apprenticed to Norn ven'Deelin
Iza Gobelyn - Captain of Gobelyn's Market, mother to Cris, Seeli, Jethri
Arin Gobelyn - deceased, husband to Iza, father to Jethri, related to Uncle
Cris Gobelyn - first mate of Gobelyn's Market, Iza's eldest child
Dyk Gobelyn - junior on Gobelyn's Market, cook
Khatelane Gobelyn - pilot on Gobelyn's Market
Mel Gobelyn - on Gobelyn's Market
Paitor Gobelyn - trader on Gobelyn's Market, brother to Iza
Seeli Gobelyn - admin on Gobelyn's Market, Iza's second child
Zam Gobelyn - on Gobelyn's Market
Grig Tomas - back-up everything on Gobelyn's Market, Arin's cousin, related to UncleKorval clan-membersAnne Davis - Lifemate to Er Thom, mother to Shan, master linguist and musician
Priscilla Delacroix y Mendoza - Lifemate to Shan (current incarnation of Moonhawk)
Miri Robertson - half-Liaden "Mercenary Retired, Bodyguard Retired, Have Weapon Will Travel", Lifemate to Val Con and joint Delm (Delmae)
Inas Bhar - Juntavas Sector Judge Natesa the Assassin, Lifemate of Pat Rin
 Gordy Arbuthnot - cabin boy, Dutiful Passage. Shan's cousin via the Davis side of the family.Korval-linkedTheo Waitley - recently discovered (by Delm Korval and the clan generally) daughter to Daav yos'Phelium and acknowledged in Ghost Ship as blood kin to Korval but not Seen by Delm Korval so not a clan member (Daav and Val Con would probably advise Theo against membership at present).
Kamele Waitley - Theo's mother and professor at Delgado University. Da'av was Kamele's Onagrata using the name Jen Sar Kiladi after Aelliana's murder.
Cheever McFarland - Master Pilot, messenger to Korval, then Pat Rin's bodyguard/chief of security.
Clarence o'Berin - Juntavas Boss on Liad; after retirement sat Second on Bechimo.
Tollance Berik-Jones aka Tolly aka 1362—a mentor, who ensures that AIs are brought into awareness well socialized. Attached to Tocohl's mission.Uncle-linked (The) Uncle (aka Yuri Tomas)—a serially reborn meddler with a finger in everybody's pies, while at any one time tending a half-dozen certain-to-be-unsettling projects of his own. Uncle remembers the old universe. Has ties to Cantra and to some crew members of Gobelyn's Market.
 Note: technically Uncle isn't a Terran because he predates Terra.
 Seignur Veeoni—one of Uncle's clones; she's working on making modern-day fractins at an undisclosed location.
 Dulsey Omron—Uncle's long-time companion and assistant.
Grig (Grigory) Tomas—See Gobelyns.
Raisy (Raisana) Thomas—Grig's older twin sister.Others'''
 Hakan Meltz - Val Con and Miri's musical friend on Vandar
 Estra Trelu - person Val Con and Miri stayed with on Vandar
 Athna Brigsbee - Vandar busybody
 Kem Darmill - Hakan Meltz' girlfriend and later (by the time of Prodigal Son) wife.
 various Juntavas various people on Surebleak various people on Vandar

Independent A.I.sJeeves - planetary security A.I. repurposed as butler to yos'Galen at Trealla Fantrol, but transferred to Jelaza Kazone upon Korval's relocation to Surebleak.Tocohl Lorlin (Daughter of Korval) - Jeeves' daughter. Currently in control of Tinsori Light.Bechimo - a "sentient and sapient" space ship, built long ago as a "long-loop trader", incorporating "old tech." He was rediscovered by Win Ton yo'Vala. Theo Waitley became his Captain.Admiral Bunter - Originally a composite AI, made up of seven semiderelict ships (with thirteen old and cramped computers between them) out of the junkyard at Jemiatha's Jumble Stop. Admiral Bunter is Theo's Fault. It guarded Jamiatha's Jumble Stop Station from pirates for a time; it was later transferred to another "cranium" and ship by Mentor Tolly Jones, Tocol Lorin, and Inkirani Yo (another mentor), and has since become a "Free Ship," no longer associated with Jamiatha's Jumble Stop.Disian - A "Free ship" mentored by Tolly Jones.

Yxtrang
Home planet unknown at this time. Usually much larger than the Terran norm, they are a war-like people who live for conquest. They are almost universally prone to thinking of the other human races as animals.

References in Crystal Soldier and Crystal Dragon suggest that the Yxtrang are the descendants of a group of "X Strain" and "Y Strain" genetically-engineered soldiers who served in a platoon with Jela and accompanied the human migration to the new universe.
Some of them venerate Jela (an "M Strain") for his skills and deeds as a warrior.

It is not known whether they can interbreed with Liadens or Terrans, though given their common genetic origin there is no reason why they should not be able to; the likely lifespan of such offspring is short, not for merely biological reasons.Nelirikk - ex-Explorer (equivalent to Scout), subsequently sworn to Line yos'Phelium, becomes Miri's bodyguard; aka "Beautiful".Hazenthull Explorer - junior Explorer, subsequently sworn to Line yos'Phelium.Diglon Rifle - enlisted soldier attached to Hazenthull, subsequently sworn to Line yos'Phelium.Commander Vepal -  Yxtrang roving ambassador.Pilot Erthax - member of Vepal’s Small Troop.Ochin Rifle - member of Vepal’s Small Troop.

Clutch Turtles
These non-humans are even larger than Yxtrang and very long-lived; they appear much like turtles walking upright, hence the name. The length of their names are directly proportional to how old they are and their accomplishments: Edger's full name apparently takes some hours to recite. They are usually slow to act, but are very dangerous when angered and can move quickly when needed.

Clutch turtles travel in starships made from hollowed-out asteroids using an electron substitution drive that can have hallucinogenic effects on the human nervous system.
Both a 'low drive' and 'high drive' exist; usually the clutch turtles use the slower low drive, but used the considerably faster high drive in "I Dare."

Clutch turtles are able to command forces of great destructive or healing potential by singing. Clutch turtles are greatly feared and avoided by the Yxtrang as the result of a resounding defeat in battle many years prior to the timeframe of the story.

The Clutch turtles encountered in the "Agent of Change" sequence make up a "market research" team on behalf of their clan, who are known for manufacturing crystalline blades of extreme sharpness and durability by growing them in caves over a timespan of decades. 
Edger
Sheather
Watcher
Selector
Handler

Cats
There are many cats which appear in the stories, usually by name, often taking an active part in the proceedings. Unlike ordinary housecats, these cats often display paranormal abilities, as well as considerable intelligence.Flinx - at Tarnia's ClanhouseLord Merlin - Anthora's cat, very active in I DarePatch - Binjali Repair Shop's resident cat and "co-owner"Lady Dignity- Daav yos'Phelium's answer to his sister's complaint that he has no (dignity, that is)Relchin - An orange-and-white cat who "enjoys the outdoors" also resides with Daav yos'PheliumSilk - Pat Rin's mouser and majordomo on SurebleakCharzi - lives in the Lysta Clanhouse in "Misfits"Coyster - Jen Sar Kiladi's cat, attached to Theo Waitley on Delgado in FledglingMandrin - Jen Sar Kiladi's black and white on Delgado

Norbears
Norbear—Size: 16–22 cm; Weight: 121–180 g. Furred quadrupedal mammal with a burrowing habit; soft dense coat, ranging in color from grey, brown, black, orange, white and mixed. Herbivore. Fearless and lively disposition, natural empath. Adapts well to domestication. Banned on certain worlds. Check port rules before importing. —Courier Wildlife Guide, Fourteenth Edition.

 Master Frodo aboard the Dutiful Passage in Conflict of Honors.
 Hevelin (named after long-time science fiction fan Rusty Hevelin)
 Podesta: Hevelin's great-granddaughter

Trees (Ssussdriads) 
The race formally known as Ssussdriads. An unusual character is Jelaza Kazone (a term that has been translated as "Jela's Promise," "Jela's Contract," or "Jela's Dream," among other variants) and the seedlings thereof (of which only two have thus far appeared in narrative). This very large tree lives in the grounds of Clan Korval's primary residence (also called Jelaza Kazone) and is in the habit of communicating its likes and dislikes to senior members of that clan; it has particularly been noted to have an interest in the likely parents of future children of the Clan.

As a young soldier, Jela found the tree on a desert planet on which his ship had crashed. Though barely a stunted seedling and the last member of a dying race, the tree was by itself able to repel invasion of the planet by the enemy Sheriekas. As an act of trust, the tree gave its only seed pod to feed the starving Jela. When Jela's rescue came, he refused to leave the tree behind.

The tree proved to be intelligent, and able to communicate via mental images. It also had the ability to manipulate the chemistry of its seed pods to create useful pharmaceutical compounds. Both these powers proved useful as Jela and Cantra searched for information necessary for mankind to escape its collapsing universe.

The name Jelaza Kazone refers to the promise Cantra yos'Phelium made to Jela, who knew he was destined to die before the migration could be complete, to see the tree through to safety on the new human homeworld. Clan Korval holds itself the guardian of this promise in perpetuity, and every trading vessel of Korval carries a seed of the tree somewhere on board, to ensure the survival of its race.

Tree mentioned in Plan B at Erob's Clan house on Lytaxin.
Seedling was installed on Cantra's ship at the end of Crystal Dragon. This sapling was recovered, alive, in Neogenesis.
Sapling planted on Yulie Sharper's freeholding.
Two saplings planted on yos'Galan's island on SureBleak.

Concepts

Melant'i

A great deal of the Liaden culture centers on melant'i. Part of this concept is roughly analogous to personal honor or good manners: a person of impeccable melant'i will behave in a certain way, in a given situation. It is also used to distinguish between a person's different roles in life. If one is speaking to a shipmate in one's role as an officer of the ship, one uses a particular mode to cue the shipmate as to the formality of the situation, and is said to be expressing one's melant'i as that officer. If, on the other hand, one is speaking to the same shipmate, but in the role of daughter, one uses a different mode and is expressing the melant'i as a family member. Different levels of formality, and actions, will be appropriate in each case.

Bows and Modes of Speech

High and Low Liaden

The High Liaden language is used for all formal conversations between people, reflecting the exact melant'i and roles of the two individuals. For example, a sentence might be in the role of Master Pilot to Student Pilot, while another sentence might be Parent to Child, or Adult to Adult, or Adult to Your Delm (your clan leader), or Adult to Another Delm (some else’s clan leader). The forms are symmetrical and directional, with Master Pilot to Student Pilot being a different mode than Student Pilot to Master Pilot. With High Liaden, you can always tell the roles that the speaker intends for the listener to interpret what is being said.

Low Liaden is reserved for informal family conversations.

Liaden Bows

Bows are used by Liadens when both meeting and parting, and also reflect the exact melant'i and roles of the two individuals. Bows are precise and complicated.

Space travel
Jump Drive
Human ships are able to travel quickly between planets by "jumping"; different technologies exist but are all fairly quick; journey durations are comparable to swift sea-travel here on Earth. Only the Clutch Turtles use a different method, with predictably idiosyncratic side-effects (of which few details are available).

Propulsion and artificial gravity is provided by Struven Surface Units which Theo describes as having a "sense of presence." The sealed unit is the source of gravity that the ship generates and "the source of the Struven Surface that the engines then amplified and tuned, building fields that allow the ship to interact with the lattice crystal of space-time and to move…elsewhere."

From The Gathering Edge:

Ships
Ships range from single-person courier, small trade craft, private ships, long-loop, and family trade ships (depreciated in modern shipping) to large trade ships (often carrying a Master Trader), bulk cargo ships, and large passenger liners. There are of course many specialty craft for station maintenance, and other utilitarian functions. In this era of relative peace, there is little mention of purpose-built military ships, except for the battleships of the warlike Yxtrang (though mercenary companies have troop ships and various support ships). Planetary governments may have small fleets of fighter craft, for defensive purposes, that operate both in air and near space. It is not uncommon, however, for merchant ships to carry weaponry to defend themselves from pirates and brigands. Some large trade ships, such as Korval's Dutiful Passage, have incorporated enough weaponry to be considered full battleships.

Pilots and piloting
Pilots are shown deference in the Liaden Universe, both in Terran and Liaden space. This is due to respect and/or fear of the pilots capabilities and their importance to the lifeblood of trade and commerce for planetary society. Pilots are addressed as "Pilot" as an honorific title.

Pilots must have superior reflexes, coordination, and spatial orientation. Pilots need proficiency in higher mathematics to be able to quickly and accurately solve equations in trajectory, orbital mechanics, and jump coordinates (to many decimal places); one does not place one's life and one's crew or passengers in peril should computer navigation fail. A pilot needs to be able to defend herself in the low port or away from civilization, thus trains in self-defense and personal weaponry.

The Pilot is responsible for the ship and passengers; the Co-pilot is responsible for the pilot and ship. (Bechimo adds, "the ship is responsible for pilot and crew.") The pilot/captain operates the ship from the primary control board—"sits First". The co-pilot, or acting co-pilot, "sits Second". Larger ships may have a third board, communications officer, executive officer, etc.

Many, if not most, pilots belong to the Pilots Guild. The Guild takes 3% of the pilot's income for life and in return provides many important services. These services include certification (required on many ships and lines), legal services and bail bonds, mail boxes with forwarding, hiring and personnel services and records, and in larger localities a Guild Hall with lounges, bars and/or cafes. Each Guild Hall has a Guild Master.

The Guild certified Pilot Classes:

 3rd Class: base level, qualified to work within system and orbit, operating ships not above Class B.
 2nd Class: mid-level, qualified to lift any ship to Class AA within system and orbit.
 1st Class: a.k.a., Jump Pilot, qualified to fly interplanetary space via Jump hyperspace technology.
 Master'': one able to perform all aspects of piloting with excellence. This grade may undertake to train and test any of the lower three levels.

First Class Jump Pilots are awarded and wear a Pilot's leather jacket. This heavy duty garment, with many internal pockets, is both a sign of rank and protection against weather and misadventure. Only Jump Pilots wear a Pilot's Jacket; this is not by law, but tends to be enforced through "social pressure" which may become physical.

In "I Dare," Pat Rin is given a rating of "1st Class S," S for "small," until the pilot has enough flight time logged on the larger ships.

Master Pilots may train and certify pilots. All Liaden Scout Pilots are of Master Class. A pilot in training will be granted "provisional" status in grade as the student advances.

Awards and recognition

Fan fiction
Lee and Miller strongly oppose any fan fiction written in the Liaden universe. "We built our universes, and our characters; they are our intellectual property; and they are not toys lying about some virtual sandbox for other kids to pick up and modify at their whim. Steve and I do not sanction fanfic written in our universes; any such work that exists, exists without our permission, and certainly without our support."

References

External links
 
 

Literary collaborations
Series of books
Science fiction book series
Fictional universes
Space opera